Mallam Yusuf Olaolu Ali, SAN is a Nigerian lawyer or law advocate, called to the Nigerian Bar in 1983. He is a Senior Advocate of Nigeria.

He has served as the chairman and Editor-in-Chief of Nigerian Bar Journal. He has authored many books including "Anatomy of Corruption In Nigeria: Issues, Challenges And Solutions" and "Two Decades Of Forensic Advocacy At The Inner Bar in print".

He is not not only a Legal icon but also a philanthropist, making contributions to humanity through the vehicle of the Yusuf Ali Foundation.

Achievements 
Mallam Yusuf Olaolu Ali, is one of the most decorated Nigerian lawyers in history. A few of the awards conferred on him are:

 Lifetime Achievement Award by the Governing Board of Editors of the American Biographical Institute
 West Africa International Golden Award for Excellence in Enterprise
 Award of Excellence presented by AIESEC ILORIN
 Award of Excellence as a Doyen of Legal Luminary in Nigeria by Nigerian Vogue
 Special Award by FIDA KWARA
 Award of Excellence by the National Association of Muslim Law Students, National Headquarters, Abuja.
 Distinguished Personality Award presented by the Faculty of Law, University of Ibadan
 Merit Award by the Nigerian Institute of Management, Kwara State Branch
 Award of Excellence by the National Association of Polytechnic Students
 Award of Excellence by the Students’ Union of the University of Ilorin
 Award of Exemplary Leadership and Service by Rotary Club, Ilorin
 Merit Award by the Ibadan Boys High School Old Boys Association
 Merit Award by All Nigeria Confederation of Principals of Secondary Schools, Osun State Branch
 Kwame Nkrumah Leadership Award of 2010 Africa Legal Icon by All Africa Students’ Union
 Award by the NBA Women Forum for Immense Contribution and Activities to the Forum
 Police Friendly Award 2009 by the KWARA State Police Command
 Kwame Nkrumah Leadership Award on Education Per Excellence/Icon of Societal Development by the West African Students’ Union
 Commander of Great IFE , (COI) by the OBAFEMI Awolowo university national Alumni.
 Honorary Degree of Doctor Of Letters (Honoris Causa) of Al HIKMA University

Membership 
Yusuf Ali SAN is a member of professional bodies such as:

 Nigerian Bar Association
 International Bar Association
 American Bar Association
 Commonwealth Lawyers Association
 Nigerian Body of Benchers

References 

Living people
20th-century Nigerian lawyers
Senior Advocates of Nigeria
Year of birth missing (living people)
21st-century Nigerian lawyers